Madjid Albry (born 23 July 1990) is a Nigerien former professional footballer who played as a midfielder.

Career
Born in Belbege, Niger, Albry began his career with German club FC St. Pauli before signing a contract with Werder Bremen on 1 July 2007. He made his debut for Werder Bremen II on 15 September 2009 in the 3. Liga against Kickers Offenbach. On 21 May 2010, it was confirmed that his contract would not be renewed and he could leave the club on 30 June 2010.

On 23 January 2010, it was announced he had signed with FC Oberneuland. In January 2011 he joined Altona 93.

References

External links
 

1988 births
Living people
Nigerien footballers
Association football midfielders
3. Liga players
Regionalliga players
FC St. Pauli players
SV Werder Bremen II players
Altonaer FC von 1893 players
USC Paloma players
Nigerien expatriate footballers
Nigerien expatriate sportspeople in Germany
Expatriate footballers in Germany